Pu Yiqi (born 25 January 1981) is a Chinese former swimmer who competed in the 1996 Summer Olympics.

References

1981 births
Living people
Chinese female freestyle swimmers
Olympic swimmers of China
Swimmers at the 1996 Summer Olympics
Place of birth missing (living people)
20th-century Chinese women